(born 31 March 1972 in Kyoto) is a Japanese former rugby union player who played as prop and hooker. Currently forwards coach of Yamaha Júbilo.

Career
Hasegawa started to play rugby at the age of 4. Until then, he played as hooker, but when he played for Higashiyama High School rugby team he played prop in Hanazono. At Chuo University RFC, he returned to play as hooker. After graduating from university, Hasegawa was part of a Kantō region representative team which toured New Zealand in 1995. His first cap for Japan was on 29 June 1997, against Hong Kong in Tokyo, where he played as a replacement flanker. Hasegawa was also called up by the then-national coach Seiji Hirao to play for Japan in the 1999 Rugby World Cup, where he played all the three pool stage matches in the tournament. He also played for Japan in the 2003 Rugby World Cup, playing all the four matches in the tournament. His last cap for Japan was against United States, in Gosford, on 27 October 2003. From 1995, after his graduation from Chuo University, he joined Suntory club, with which he won the Japan Company Rugby Football Championship in 1997 and 1998, as well the All-Japan Rugby Football Championship in 2000 and 2002. He retired in 2007 and became a forwards coach initially for Suntory and later for Yamaha Jubilo.

Notes

External links

1972 births
Living people
Rugby union props
Rugby union hookers
Sportspeople from Kyoto
Japanese rugby union players
Japan international rugby union players
Asian Games medalists in rugby union
Rugby union players at the 1998 Asian Games
Asian Games silver medalists for Japan
Medalists at the 1998 Asian Games